The Campbell Islands (or Campbell Island Group) are a group of subantarctic islands, belonging to New Zealand. They lie about 600 km south of Stewart Island. Ecologically, they are part of the Antipodes Subantarctic Islands tundra ecoregion. The islands are one of five subantarctic island groups collectively designated as a World Heritage Site by UNESCO.

Geography
 Campbell Island / Motu Ihupuku
 Dent Island
 Jacquemart Island
 Folly Island or Folly Islands

The islands are relatively flat; due to tectonic pressure, however, there are mountains in the centre of each island. A sea stack at the southern tip of Jacquemart Island is – with the exception of the country's Antarctic claims – New Zealand's southernmost point.

Flora and fauna
Since its discovery in 1810, the flora and fauna have been under threat from mammals introduced by humans. Cats (Felis catus) and Norway rats (Rattus novegicus) prey on native birds and much of the vegetation was destroyed by sheep (Ovis aries) and cattle (Bos taurus). Restoration of the island began in 1970 with the removal of the feral cattle and sheep; subsequently the island's vegetation recovered, becoming denser. In 2001, four helicopters, under instruction from the New Zealand Department of Conservation (DOC) spread 120 tonnes of rodenticide-laced bait across the island over one month. Repeated monitoring has found no signs of rats since. This operation became a template for rat eradication on other islands around the world.

Important Bird Area
The Campbell Islands have been identified as an Important Bird Area (IBA) by BirdLife International because of its significance as a breeding site for several species of seabirds as well as the endemic Campbell teal and Campbell snipe.  The seabirds are southern rockhopper and yellow-eyed penguins, Antipodean, southern royal, light-mantled, black-browed, Campbell and grey-headed albatrosses, northern giant and white-chinned petrels, and the Campbell shag.

See also

 Desert island
 List of Antarctic and subantarctic islands
 List of islands
 List of islands of New Zealand
 New Zealand Subantarctic Islands

References

External links
 Map of the Campbell Islands with several surrounding islets, including Jacquemart Island lying south of the main island and Dent island lying northwest of the main island

 
Archipelagoes of New Zealand
Archipelagoes of the Southern Ocean
Important Bird Areas of New Zealand
Island restoration